Derek Frank Lawden (15 September 1919 – 15 February 2008) was a British-New Zealand mathematician.

Academic career
After reading mathematics at Cambridge University he served in the Royal Artillery and then lectured at the Royal Military College of Science and the College of Advanced Technology Birmingham, where he worked on rocket trajectories and space flight. In 1956 he moved to University of Canterbury as professor. In the 1960s he received a DSc from Cambridge, was appointed a Fellow of the Royal Society of New Zealand and won the Hector Medal. He return to the UK to University of Aston in 1967.

After the World War II, he was the first to register in the literature considerations about the use of gravity assist for space exploration. In his pioneering work on optimal space trajectories in the 1960s, he coined the term "primer vector" to refer to the adjoint variables in the costate equation associated with the velocity vector, pointing out their fundamental connection to optimal thrust.

References

External links
 google scholar

British expatriates in New Zealand
People from Birmingham, West Midlands
British Army personnel of World War II
Academics of Cranfield University
Academics of Aston University
Alumni of the University of Cambridge
Academic staff of the University of Canterbury
Rocket scientists
English mathematicians
Fellows of the Royal Society of New Zealand
1919 births
2008 deaths
20th-century British mathematicians
Royal Artillery personnel
Military personnel from Birmingham, West Midlands